Ted Baker is a British high-street clothing retail company known for suits, shirts, and dresses. It was founded in 1988 in Glasgow, Scotland. The company is owned by Authentic Brands Group, after its £211 million acquisition in October 2022. The brand has over 500 shops and concessions around the world.

History
Founder Ray Kelvin, who named the company after a self-styled alter ego, an "intrepid aviator, an all-round sportsman and the consort of princesses and Hollywood beauties", started his first store in March 1988 in Glasgow, and opened further stores in Manchester and Nottingham. In 1990 Ted Baker opened a store in Covent Garden, London (with additional stores in London's Soho, Nottingham and Leeds) and Kelvin bought the company outright from part-owners Goldberg and Sons. A new range, Ted Baker Woman, was launched in 1995.

The company purchased its headquarters in London for £58.25 million in 2017.

In October 2022, Ted Baker was acquired by Authentic Brands Group for £211 million. Under the terms of a takeover bid by the Authentic Brands Group, effective from 21 October 2022,  Ted Baker plc's shareholders will be issued with £1.10 in cash in exchange for each of their shares. The deal marked the end of the company's listing on the London Stock Exchange.

Retail stores and outlets

Ted Baker has a number of stand-alone stores in the UK. The Ted Baker range is also sold by other retailers (which it refers to as Ted Baker Trustees), in particular in stores of the John Lewis Partnership and House of Fraser. Ted Baker also has stores at Bicester Village Retail Outlet, Swindon Designer Outlet, Portsmouth's Gunwharf Quays and Cheshire Oaks Designer Outlet. There is a Ted Baker concession in all Selfridges & Co stores; London, Birmingham, Manchester and the Trafford Centre.

Ted Baker has stores and outlets in the rest of Europe, the United States, Canada, Australia, Asia, South Africa and the Middle East. It opened a store on Fifth Avenue in New York in August 2012.

As of 2018, Ted Baker has 500 stores and concessions worldwide: 192 in the UK, 98 in Europe, 111 in the US and Canada, 80 in the Middle East, Africa and Asia and 9 in Australia.

In April 2020, Ted Baker furloughed nearly 2,000 employees, including head office staff, due to the COVID-19 crisis. The company has also suspended non-essential capital expenditure and halted any discretionary operating expenses.

Wholesale operations 
Ted Baker has expanded its high street presence through its wholesale business which includes Australia, New Zealand, the United States, Canada, Norway, Greece, Spain, the Netherlands, Belgium, as well as the British Isles. Wholesale operations commenced in 1994 through careful selection of retail stores.

Governance
In response to an online petition started by a former employee alleging that Ray Kelvin, who was then the company's chief executive, had hugged employees inappropriately, it was announced on 7 December 2018 that Kelvin was  taking voluntary leave of absence from the company while the allegations were investigated and that Lindsay Page would act as chief executive. On 4 March 2019 it was announced that Kelvin had resigned and would be leaving the company immediately. Poor trading figures led to Page and executive chairman David Bernstein stepping down from their roles, and Rachel Osborne being appointed acting CEO, in December 2019.

References

External links

 Official corporate website
 Official retail website

1988 establishments in the United Kingdom
British brands
British suit makers
Clothing brands of the United Kingdom
Clothing retailers of the United Kingdom
Companies listed on the London Stock Exchange
Eyewear brands of the United Kingdom
Retail companies established in 1988
Shoe companies of the United Kingdom
2022 mergers and acquisitions